Rabbi Yehuda Kalmen Marlow (17 February 1932 – 23 June 2000) was a German-American Hasidic rabbi associated with the Chabad movement. Rabbi Marlow served as the rabbi of the Crown Heights Jewish community from 1985–2000.

Biography
Rabbi Marlow was born in Frankfurt, Germany, in 1932. His family moved to the United States in 1939. Rabbi Marlow later joined the Chabad movement. Years later he was elected to the Crown Heights Beth Din (rabbinical court), and eventually succeeded Rabbi Zalman Shimon Dworkin as Av Beth Din.

Rabbi Marlow died in 2000 from a heart attack. He was buried in the Old Montefiore Cemetery in Queens.

References

1932 births
2000 deaths
Orthodox rabbis from New York City
20th-century American rabbis